The Bear is a 1984 biopic starring Gary Busey and Jon-Erik Hexum.  The film was written by Michael Kane, directed by Richard C. Sarafian, and produced by James A. Hearn and Larry G. Spangler.

Plot
The Bear follows the life of Paul "Bear" Bryant (Busey), head coach of the University of Alabama football team, who died in 1983. Jon-Erik Hexum plays Pat Trammell in the film.

Cast
 Gary Busey as Paul W. "Bear" Bryant
 Jon-Erik Hexum as Pat Trammell
 Scott Campbell as Dennis Goehring
 Robert Craighead as Jack Pardee
 Buddy Farmer as Herman Ball
 Charles Gabrielson as Steve Meilinger
 Ivan Green as Mr. Gallagher
 Steve Greenstein as Joe Namath
 Cary Guffey as Grandson Marc Tyson
 Cynthia Leake as Mary Harmon Bryant
 D'Urville Martin as Billy
 Michael McGrady as Gene Stallings
 Muriel Moore as Miss Vernon
 Owen E. Orr as Ermal Allen
 Michael Prokopuk as Bob Lockett
 Brett Rice as Don Hutson
 Damon Sarafian as Don Watson
 Tod Spangler as Bobby Keith
 Harry Dean Stanton as Coach Frank Thomas
 Carmen Thomas as Mae Martin Bryant Tyson
 William Wesley Neighbors, Jr. as Billy Neighbors
 Ned Luke as Football Player

References

External links
  
 
 

1984 films
1980s biographical drama films
American sports drama films
1980s sports drama films
American football films
American biographical drama films
Films scored by Bill Conti
Films shot in California
Films shot in Texas
1984 drama films
Films directed by Richard C. Sarafian
1980s English-language films
1980s American films